Chethipuzha  is a village in Kottayam district in the state of Kerala, India. It is famous for its educational institutions and also for the health care services in the village. The Sacred Heart Church in here is another prominent attraction of the village.

Demographics
 India census, Chethipuzha had a population of 24842 with 12197 males and 12645 females.

References

Villages in Kottayam district
Changanassery